Venus and Amor (also known as Venus and Cupid) is painting by the so-called "Venus Painter" of Hans Holbein the Youngers workshop and is conserved in the Kunstmuseum Basel, Switzerland. It was assumed for a long time to be painting by Hans Holbein the Younger, but research showed that this could not be possible. It was discovered that the painter had used a sort of a carbon paper with the contours of the already existing Laïs and used it to transfer those contours in reverse on the new portrait he was to paint of Venus. As the portrait of Laïs is dated with 1526, the year of Hans Holbeins departure from Basel, it is assumed that the work has been painted between 1526 and 1528, the years Holbein stayed in London. The painting depicts the Roman goddess of love, Venus, with her son Amor (Cupid) and the model is believed to be either Magdalena Offenburg or her daughter Dorothea. They are shown in front of a large hanging green curtain and behind a low parapet. Venus is depicted with an open gesture and sincere gaze. Cupid is seen climbing onto the parapet while holding love's arrow in his left hand. He has red-orange hair, rendered in the same colouring and tone of the rich cloth sleeves covering his mother's upper arms.

Such influences can be seen in the gesture of Venus, whose pose closely echoes that of Jesus in Leonardo's 1498 Last Supper. In addition, her long, oval, idealised face seems closely modeled on Leonardo's depictions of the Virgin Mary.

Leonardesque portrait painting was very popular across northern Europe during the 1520s, and it is generally believed that a number of Holbein's works from this period were direct attempts to seduce and gain favour from potential wealthy patrons. The art historians Oskar Bätschmann and Pascal Griener wrote in 1999 that, as with the artist's similar Lais of Corinth, Venus' open hand is "stretched towards the beholder and prospective collector." 

The work was first mentioned when it came into the possession of the collector Basilius Amerbach in 1578 as a gift from his cousin, Franz Rechburger. Amerbach's inventory records that the work was formed as a portrait of a lady from the Offenburg family, however this claim has not been substantiated by art historians.

References

Sources

 Batschmann, Oskar & Griener, Pascal. Hans Holbein. Reaktion Books, 1999. 
 Toman, Rolf (ed). Renaissance: Art and Architecture in Europe during the 15th and 16th Centuries. Bath: Parragon, 2009. 

Paintings of Venus
Paintings of Cupid